Delvino is a sparsely populated  village in Blagoevgrad Municipality, in Blagoevgrad Province, Bulgaria. It is situated in Rila mountain few kilometers east of Blagoevgrad.

References

Villages in Blagoevgrad Province